Los bandidos del río frío is a Mexican telenovela directed by Antulio Jiménez Pons for Televisión Independiente de México in 1976.

Cast 
Julissa as Cecilia
Ofelia Guilmáin as Calavera Catrina
Víctor Alcocer
Júlio Aldama as Evaristo
Sergio Bustamante as Relumbrón
Blanca Sánchez as Mariana
Rogelio Guerra as Juan Robreño
Norma Lazareno as Casilda
Miguel Manzano as Licenciado Olañeta
Jorge del Campo as Lamparilla
José Carlos Ruiz as Bedolla
Carmelita González as Pascuala

References

External links 

Mexican telenovelas
1976 telenovelas
Televisa telenovelas
Spanish-language telenovelas
1976 Mexican television series debuts
1976 Mexican television series endings